Congenital rubella infection (CRI) occurs when a fetus contracts the rubella virus via maternal-fetal transmission. It can result in various outcomes ranging from asymptomatic infection to congenital defects to miscarriage and fetal death. Congenital rubella syndrome (CRS) refers to a congenital rubella infection that results in various presentations of birth anomalies. If infection occurs 0–11 weeks after conception, the infant has a 90% risk of being affected. If the infection occurs 12–20 weeks after conception, the risk is 20%. Infants are not generally affected if rubella is contracted during the third trimester. Congenital rubella syndrome was discovered in 1941 by Australian Norman McAlister Gregg.

The most common congenital defects affect the ophthalmologic, cardiac, auditory, and neurologic systems.  Diagnosis of congenital rubella syndrome is made through a series of clinical and laboratory findings and management is based on the infant’s clinical presentation. Maintaining rubella outbreak control via vaccination is essential in preventing congenital rubella infection and congenital rubella syndrome.



Signs and symptoms

The classic triad for congenital rubella syndrome is:
 Sensorineural deafness (58% of patients)
 Eye abnormalities—especially retinopathy, cataract, glaucoma, and microphthalmia (43% of patients)
 Congenital heart disease—especially pulmonary artery stenosis and patent ductus arteriosus (50% of patients)

Other manifestations of CRS may include:
 Spleen, liver, or bone marrow problems (some of which may disappear shortly after birth)
 Intellectual disability
 Small head size (microcephaly)
 Low birth weight
 Thrombocytopenic purpura, leading to easy or excessive bleeding or bruising
 Extramedullary hematopoiesis (presents as a characteristic blueberry muffin rash)
 Enlarged liver (hepatomegaly)
 Small jaw size (micrognathia)
 Skin lesions 

Children who have been exposed to rubella in the womb should also be watched closely as they age for any indication of:
 Developmental delay
 Autism
 Schizophrenia
 Growth retardation
 Learning disabilities
 Diabetes mellitus

Diagnosis

Diagnosis of congenital rubella syndrome is made based on clinical findings and laboratory criteria.  Laboratory criteria includes at least one of the following:

 Detection of the rubella virus via RT-PCR
 Detection of rubella-specific IgM antibody
 Detection of infant rubella-specific IgG antibody at higher levels (and persists for a longer time) than expected for passive maternal transmission
 Isolation of the rubella virus by nasal, blood, throat, urine, or cerebrospinal fluid specimens

Clinical definition is characterized by findings in the following categories:

 Cataracts/congenital glaucoma, congenital heart disease (most commonly, patent ductus arteriosus or peripheral pulmonary artery stenosis), hearing impairment, pigmentary retinopathy
 Purpura, hepatosplenomegaly, jaundice, microcephaly, developmental delay, meningoencephalitis, radiolucent bone disease

A patient is classified into the following cases depending on their clinical and laboratory findings: 

 Suspected: A patient that has one or more of the clinical findings listed above but does not meet the definition for probable or confirmed classification
 Probable: A patient that does not have laboratory confirmation of congenital rubella but has either two clinical findings from Group 1 as listed above OR one clinical finding from Group 1 and one clinical finding from Group 2 as listed above
 Confirmed: A patient with at least one laboratory finding and one clinical finding (from either group) as listed above
 Infection only: A patient with no clinical findings as described above but meeting at least one confirmed laboratory criteria

Management 
Infants with known rubella exposure during pregnancy or those with a confirmed or suspected infection should receive close follow-up and supportive care. There are no medications or antivirals that will shorten the clinical course of the virus. Only those with immunity to rubella should have contact with infected infants, as they can shed viral particles in their respiratory secretions though 1 year of age (unless they test with repeated negative viral cultures at age 3 months). Many infants can be born with multiple birth defects that require multidisciplinary management and interventions based on clinical manifestations. Often times these infants will require extended period or life-long follow up with medical specialists.

Auditory Care 
Many infants with CRS may be born with sensorineural deafness and thus should undergo a newborn hearing evaluation. Hearing loss may not be apparent at birth and thus requires close auditory follow up. Infants with confirmed hearing impairment may require hearing aids and may benefit from an early intervention program.

Ophthalmologic Care 
Eye abnormalities including cataracts, infantile glaucoma and retinopathy are common in infants born with CRS. Infants should undergo eye examinations after birth and during early childhood. Those with congenital eye defects require care from a pediatric ophthalmologist for specialized care and follow up.

Cardiac Care 
Congenital cardiac anomalies including pulmonary artery stenosis and patent ductus arteriosus can be seen in infants with CRS. Infants should undergo cardiac evaluation soon after birth and those with confirmed cardiac lesions will require specialized care with a pediatric cardiologist for any interventions and follow-up care.

Prevention
Vaccinating the majority of the population is effective at preventing congenital rubella syndrome. With the introduction of the rubella vaccine in 1969, the number of cases of rubella in the United States has decreased 99%, from 57,686 cases in 1969 to 271 cases in 1999. For women who plan to become pregnant, the MMR (measles mumps, rubella) vaccination is highly recommended, at least 28 days prior to conception. The vaccine should not be given to women who are already pregnant as it contains live viral particles. Other preventative actions can include the screening and vaccinations of high-risk personnel, such as medical and child care professions.

Infants with birth defects suspected to be caused by congenital rubella infection should be investigated thoroughly. Confirmed cases should be reported to the local or state health department to assess control of the virus and isolation of the infant should be maintained.

References

Congenital disorders
Infections specific to the perinatal period
Rubella
Syndromes caused by microbes
Virus-related cutaneous conditions